USS St. Regis River (LSM(R)-529) was a LSM(R)-501 class landing ship.  Originally the ship only had the designation LSMR-529.  She was laid down in June 1945 by the Brown Shipbuilding Co. at Houston, Texas, as LSMR-529, a rocket-armed medium landing ship; launched in July 1945; and commissioned on 7 September 1945.

LSMR-529 was active in Navy service from September 1945 until March 1946, but remained in the United States. In March 1946, she was placed out of commission, in reserve, and berthed at Green Cove Springs, Florida, where she remained for the next 14 years. On 1 October 1955, LSMR-529 was named St. Regis River. Never recommissioned, St. Regis River was sold to the Atlas Iron and Metal Corp. on 5 July 1960 for scrapping.

References

External links
 Navsource: USS St. Regis River
 Hazegray mirror of DANFS: USS St. Regis River

 

Ships built in Houston
World War II amphibious warfare vessels of the United States
LSM(R)-501-class medium landing ships
1945 ships